The Vraćevšnica Monastery is a Serbian Orthodox monastery in Vraćevšnica, Gornji Milanovac, Serbia, built in 1428–29 on the orders of Radič (fl. 1389–1441), a magnate in the service of Stefan Lazarević and Đurađ Branković. It is part of the Žiča eparchate.

It was built in the Resava architectural style and dedicated to Saint George.

References

1428 establishments in Europe
Serbian Orthodox monasteries in Serbia
Serbian Despotate
Cultural Monuments of Great Importance (Serbia)